Nikolay Dimitrov Hristozov (6 January 1931 - 15 May 2015) was a Bulgarian writer and poet, with some 19 published books to his credit. 

Hristozov's most well-known work was the novel Po diryata na bezsledno izcheznalite (On the Tracks of the Missing), which has been adapted into a miniseries of the same name.

References

Bulgarian writers
1931 births
2015 deaths